Eridantes is a genus of North American dwarf spiders that was first described by C. R. Crosby & S. C. Bishop in 1933.  it contains only three species: E. diodontos, E. erigonoides, and E. utibilis.

See also
 List of Linyphiidae species (A–H)

References

Araneomorphae genera
Linyphiidae
Spiders of North America